Toxicodendron rydbergii, the western poison ivy, is a species of Toxicodendron in the cashew family. It is native to most of Canada from the Maritimes to British Columbia, and most of the contiguous United States except the southeastern states, New Jersey, Delaware, and California.  It can be found growing in forests, and other wooded areas, usually near streams and rivers.

Unlike Toxicodendron radicans (eastern poison ivy), which often appears as a trailing or climbing vine, Toxicodendron rydbergii is a shrub that can grow to 1 m (3 ft) tall, rarely up to 3 m (10 ft). The leaves are trifoliate and alternate.  The leaflets are variable in size and shape, and are usually 15 cm (6 in) long, turning yellow or orange in autumn. On the compound trifoliate leaves, the two leaflets opposite each other are typically asymmetrical, in contrast to the terminal leaflet which always shows bilateral symmetry.  The fruits are small, round, and yellowish.

Description 
 Toxicodendron rydbergii  is a bushy shrub (height 30 cm). Leaves alternate, often shiny; with 3 divisions (leaflets), each with a tail, the one in the center a little longer; leaflets irregular in outline and sinuous with or without teeth, well marked veins; color varying with the seasons: wine red in spring, green in summer and multicolored in autumn. Creamy white or greenish flowers clustered in cones at the base of the leaves. Ribbed fruits; white, yellow or brown; the size of a dry pea; noticeable especially when the leaves have fallen. Most often, we find individuals without flowers and fruits.

Caution
All parts of this plant contain urushiol, which can cause severe contact dermatitis in most individuals.

References

rydbergii
Flora of North America
Plants described in 1900